The 1947 Wellington City mayoral election was part of the New Zealand local elections held that same year. In 1947, election were held for the Mayor of Wellington plus other local government positions including fifteen city councillors. The polling was conducted using the standard first-past-the-post electoral method.

The election resulted in the re-election of incumbent Mayor Will Appleton defeating his sole opponent Nathan Seddon of the Labour Party, who was the Chairman of the Wellington Education Board.

Mayoralty results

Councillor results

References

Mayoral elections in Wellington
1947 elections in New Zealand
Politics of the Wellington Region
1940s in Wellington
November 1947 events in New Zealand